The Battle of the Oinousses Islands comprised two separate actions, on 9 and 19 February 1695 near the Oinousses, a small island group off Cape Karaburun in western Anatolia, between a Venetian fleet under  and the Ottoman fleet under Mezzo Morto Hüseyin. The result of the first battle was a Venetian defeat, and although the second engagement ended in a draw, the Venetian position in Chios became untenable, forcing Zeno to abandon the island.

In the first engagement, Venetian casualties were 142 killed and 300 wounded on the sailing ships, excluding the three ships lost, and 323 killed and 303 wounded on the galleys. All together, less than 2500 casualties. In the second engagement, the Venetians were at a numerical disadvantage, due to the loss of three ships and the absence of the damaged San Vittorio. Venetian deaths were 132, and Fama Volante was damaged, along with 2 Ottoman sailing ships.

Opposing forces (9 February)

Venice (Zeno)
 Stella Maris - Blew up
 Rosa 60
 San Lorenzo Giustinian 70/80
 Leon Coronato - Blew up
 Nettuno 50/60
 Valor Coronato 54
 San Domenico 60
 Redentore del Mundo 70
 Vittoria 50/60
 San Nicolo 54
 Sacra Lega 60
 Drago Volante c.60 - Blew up
 Fama Volante 50
 Madonna della Salute 50
 Venere Armata 52
 Ercole Vittorioso 50/60
 San Antonio di Padova c.50
 Pace ed Abbondanza 50
 San Giovanni Battista Piccolo c.50
 San Vittorio 62 - Damaged
 San Giovanni Battista Grande 60
 5 galleasses
 21 galleys

Ottoman Empire (Mezzo Morto)
 20 sailing ships
 24 galleys

References
 

 

Conflicts in 1695
Battles of the Great Turkish War
Naval battles of the Ottoman–Venetian Wars
17th century in Greece
1695 in the Ottoman Empire